Magi King Sison (born May 24, 1988) is a Filipino professional basketball player who last played for the Quezon City Capitals of the Maharlika Pilipinas Basketball League (MPBL). He was drafted 11th overall by the Shopinas.com Clickers in the 2011 PBA draft.

PBA career statistics

Correct as of October 28, 2013

Season

|-
| align=left | 2011–12
| align=left | Shopinas.com/Air21
| 29 || 13.1 || .400 || .000 || .500 || 3.6 || .2 || .2 || .5 || 2.9
|-
| align=left | 2012–13
| align=left | Petron Blaze
| 10 || 2.9 || .333 || .000 || .333 || .5 || .0 || .0 || .0 || 0.5
|-
| align="left" | Career
| align="left" |
| 39 || 10.5 || .396 || .000 || .455 || 2.8 || .1 || .1 || .4 || 2.3

References

1988 births
Living people
Centers (basketball)
Ilocano people
Basketball players from Pangasinan
Filipino men's basketball players
UP Fighting Maroons basketball players
Air21 Express players
San Miguel Beermen players
Barako Bull Energy players
Maharlika Pilipinas Basketball League players
Air21 Express draft picks